Ayatollah Mohammad Feyz Sarabi (23 August 1928 – 11 April 2022) was an Iranian Shiite cleric and politician. He was a member of the 4th and 5thAssembly of Experts from the East Azerbaijan electorate. Feyzi won his membership with 283,856 votes.

See also 
 List of members in the Fourth Term of the Council of Experts
 List of members in the Fifth Term of the Council of Experts
 List of Ayatollahs

References

1928 births
2022 deaths
Iranian Islamic religious leaders
Members of the Assembly of Experts
People from East Azerbaijan Province